Aurel Șunda (born 14 October 1957) is a Romanian former footballer and manager. As a footballer, Șunda played mainly as a defender for Politehnica Timișoara, club for which he played in more than 200 matches. In fact, as a player, Șunda never left Timișoara, also playing for other local teams such as CFR Timișoara, Progresul Timișoara or UM Timișoara.

He retired in 1991 and started a career as a football manager at his last club where he played, UM Timișoara. In the 1990s Șunda remained in Banat as a manager and/ or assistant coach of Politehnica Timișoara, CSM Reșița or UM Timișoara. Former UMT player promoted the team in the top-flight, in 2000, for the first time in the history of "the zebras". In the 2000s Șunda was a globetrotter, managing 12 clubs, but with very good results at Unirea Alba Iulia and CFR Cluj, periods in which he received his nickname "the Professor". After 2010, Șunda was the manager of FC Hunedoara and Săgeata Năvodari, just to return at his great love, Politehnica Timișoara, now represented by one of its successors, ACS Poli Timișoara. He was sacked five months later, in March 2014, subsequently working as a youth center manager of the club.

Achievements

Player
Politehnica Timișoara
Romanian Cup (1): 1979–80
Divizia B (2): 1983–84, 1986–87

UM Timișoara
 Divizia C (1): 1990–91

Manager
UM Timișoara
 Divizia B (1): 2000–01

Unirea Alba Iulia
 Divizia B (1): 2002–03

CFR Cluj
 Divizia B (1): 2003–04

References

External links
 
 
 

1957 births
Living people
People from Timiș County
Romanian footballers
Association football defenders
Liga I players
Liga II players
FC Politehnica Timișoara players
FC CFR Timișoara players
Romanian football managers
FC Politehnica Timișoara managers
CSM Reșița managers
CSM Unirea Alba Iulia managers
CFR Cluj managers
ASC Oțelul Galați managers
CSM Jiul Petroșani managers
FC Brașov (1936) managers
CSM Ceahlăul Piatra Neamț managers
CS Corvinul Hunedoara managers
AFC Săgeata Năvodari managers
ACS Poli Timișoara managers